Thomas Winkelhock (born 22 May 1968 in Waiblingen, Baden-Württemberg) is a German racing driver. He has competed in such series as the European Touring Car Championship and the German Formula Three Championship. He won the Formula König series in 1989 and was the ADAC Procar Series champion in 1998.

References

External links
 

1968 births
Living people
People from Waiblingen
Sportspeople from Stuttgart (region)
German racing drivers
Deutsche Tourenwagen Masters drivers
German Formula Renault 2.0 drivers
German Formula Three Championship drivers
Racing drivers from Baden-Württemberg
European Touring Car Championship drivers

Engstler Motorsport drivers